ABA Business Center is a mixed-use highrise in Tirana, Albania. At 83m high, it consists of 21 floors above ground and 3 underground floors for parking space.

The building offers prime office space for conferences and meeting rooms. On the 4th floor of ABA is Bar Restaurant Fusion, one of the most popular destinations in the city. ABA Fitness is located on the 5th floor of the Center. On the 21st floor you will find Bar Restaurant ABA 21 which offers gourmet cuisine.  For all those following the latest fashion trends or interested in buying high quality European products, ABA Business Center houses Coin, which occupies five stories of the building, approximately 6000 m2 of marketplace.

References

External links
 Official website

See also
 List of tallest buildings in Albania

Buildings and structures in Tirana
Skyscrapers in Albania